The Majinghorn is a mountain of the Bernese Alps, located east of Leukerbad in the canton of Valais. It lies between the Ferdenrothorn and the Torrenthorn, on the chain that separates the valley of Leukerbad from the Lötschental.

References

External links
 Majinghorn on Hikr

Mountains of the Alps
Alpine three-thousanders
Mountains of Switzerland
Mountains of Valais